The 2015 Hong Kong Women's Sevens was the 18th edition of the tournament. It took place between 26–27 March 2015. Canada won their third consecutive Hong Kong title. The event also marked the debut of Argentina and Mexico as the 38th and 39th international unions to participate in Hong Kong since 1997.

Tournament

Pool stages

Pool A

Canada 31-7 Samoa
Argentina 42-0 Mexico
Canada 66-0 Mexico
Argentina 12-17 Samoa
Samoa 27-0 Mexico
Canada 42-0 Argentina

Pool B

China 7-26 Kazakhstan
Hong Kong 41-0 Singapore
China 17-12 Singapore
Hong Kong 17-5 Kazakhstan
Kazakhstan 29-7 Singapore
Hong Kong 31-14 China

Pool C

Japan 43-7 Papua New Guinea
Netherlands 33-5 Tunisia
Japan 33-0 Tunisia
Netherlands 22-12 Papua New Guinea
Papua New Guinea 0-26 Tunisia
Japan 19-12 Netherlands

Knockout stages

Bowl

Plate

Cup

References 

2015
2015 rugby sevens competitions
2015 in women's rugby union
2015 in Asian rugby union